Radiologic signs are the signs used for diagnosing physiological and pathological conditions in radiologic images. This list includes the names of radiologic signs in alphabetical order.

 Abdominal cocoon sign    

 Absent bowtie sign    

 Acorn cyst breast    

 Air bronchogram    

 Air crescent sign    

 Angel wing appearance    

 Anteater nose sign    

 Apple core sign    

 Aortic nipple sign   

 Aortic unfolding

 Bat wing appearance    

 Bamboo sign    

 Banana sign    

 Beer paw sign    

 Beveled edge sign    

 Black pleural line    

 Blade of grass sign (also known as Flame sign)

 Blumensaat's line

 Bird of prey sign    

 Bite sign    

 Bohler's angle

 Bone-within-a-bone appearance    

 Boomerang sign    

 Bowler hat sign    

 Bow tie appearance    

 Brim sign    

 Bucket handle tear    

 Bulging fissure sign    

 Butterfly vertebra    

 C sign    

 Cardiothoracic ratio

 Canga's bead sign

 Cannonball metastases    

 Carman meniscus sign    

 Celery stalking    

 Cervicothoracic sign    

 Cheerio sign

 Cluster of grapes sign

 Cobb angle

 Cobblestone appearance    

 Cobra head sign    

 Cockade image    

 Codfish vertebra    

 Codman's triangle    

 Coffee bean sign    

 Coin lesion    

 Colon cut-off sign    

 Collar button ulcer    

 Comb sign    

 Comet sign    

 Comet tail sign    

 Coned epiphyses    

 Continuous diaphragm sign    

 Copula sign    

 Cord sign 

 Corduroy sign    

 Corkscrew oesophagus    

 Corkscrew sign    

 Cortical ring sign    

 Cottage loaf sign    

 Cotton wool appearance    

 Cœur en sabot

 Crazy paving sign    

 Crescent sign    

 Crowded carpal sign    

 Cupola sign

 Dagger sign    

 Deep lateral femoral notch sign

 Deep sulcus sign    

 Dense artery sign

 Dense hilum sign    

 Dense MCA sign    

 Dense metaphyseal bands

 Dense triangle sign  

 Double bronchial wall sign    

 Double bubble sign

 Double decidual sign

 Double density sign    

 Double duct sign  

 Double posterior cruciate ligament Sign

 Double track sign    

 Doughnut sign    

 Draping aorta sign    

 Dripping candle wax sign    

 Drooping lily sign    

 Drooping shoulder sign    

 Egg on a string sign    

 Eggshell calcification    

 Elephant on a flagpole sign    

 Empty sella sign    

 Empty vertebral body sign    

 Erlenmeyer flask deformity    

 Eye of the tiger sign    

 Fabella sign

 Fairbank's changes

 Fat pad sign

 Faceless kidney    

 Falciform ligament sign    

 Fallen fragment sign    

 Figure 3 sign    

 Fishhook ureter    

 Flat waist sign    

 Pear shaped breast    

 Floating teeth  

 Football sign    

 Fragment in notch sign    

 Garland's triad

 Ghost vertebrae  

 Gilula's lines

 Gloved finger sign    

 Goblet sign    

 Golden's S sign    

 Golf ball on a tree sign    

 Gooseneck sign  

 Ground-glass opacity

 Growth arrest lines

 Gullwing appearance    

 Haglund's deformity  

 Half moon sign  

 Halo sign

 Hamburger bun sign  

 Hampton's hump  

 Hampton's line  

 Hair-on-end appearance  

 Harris lines

 Hatchet head  

 Head cheese sign  

 Hidebound appearance

 Hilgenreiner's line

 High-attenuation crescent sign

 Hill Sach's deformity  

 Hilum convergence sign  

 Hilum overlay sign  

 Holly Leaf sign  

 Honda sign  

 Honeycombing 

 Hotcross bun sign  

 Hot nose sign  

 Hot quadrate sign

 Hurricane sign  

 H-shaped vertebrae  

 Incomplete fissure sign  

 Incomplete rim sign  

 Inside out sign  

 Insular ribbon sign  

 Ivory phalanx sign  

 Ivory vertebra  

 Jackstone calculus  

 J shaped sella  

 Juxtaphrenic peak sign  

 Keyhole sign  

 Keyhole sign (breast)  

 Klein's line

 Klemm's sign

 Kerley lines

 Kidney bean sign  

 Knuckle sign  

 Laminated periosteal reaction  

 Lateral capsular sign  

 Lateral femoral notch sign  

 Leadpipe colon  

 Lead Pipe fracture  

 Lemon sign  

 Leontiasis Ossea  

 Licked candy stick appearance  

 Light bulb sign  

 Linguine sign  

 Loosers zone

 Luftsichel sign  

 MacEwan sign  

 Mass effect

 Maiden waist deformity 

 Mathe's sign

 Mediastinal shift

 Midline shift (radiology)

 Mercedes Benz sign  

 Mickey Mouse ears  

 Mickey Mouse pelvis  

 Misty mesentery sign  

 Modic changes

 Molar tooth sign  

 Moulage sign  

 Mumoli's sign

 Naked facet sign  

 Napoleon hat sign  

 Nubbin sign  

 Nutcracker fracture  

 Oil droplet appearance  

 Omental cake 

 Onion skin periosteal reaction  

 Osteopathia striata

 Osteoporosis circumscripta

 Pad sign  

 Pancake kidney  

 Pancake vertebra  

 Panda sign  

 Palla's sign

 Pauwel's angle

 Pawnbroker's sign  

 Pearshaped bladder  

 Pedicle sign  

 Pencil-in-cup sign  

 Pencil Pointing  

 Peribronchial cuffing

 Pericardial fat pad sign  

 Perkin's line

 Phantom calyx sign  

 Picket fence appearance  

 Picture framing (radiology)  

 Pie-in-the-sky sign  

 Piece of Pie sign  

 Playboy sign

 Pneumatosis intestinalis

 Pneumoarthrogram sign  

 Polka dot sign  

 Popcorn appearance  

 Popcorn calcification  

 Pseudofracture

 Pseudo Rigler's sign  

 Puckered panniculus sign  

 Putty kidney  

 Pulmonary consolidation

 Pyloric Tit sign  

 Rachitic rosary  

 Rarefying osteitis

 Rat bite sign  

 Rat tail sign  

 Reverse 3 sign  

 Reverse hamburger bun sign  

 Reverse pulmonary edema  

 Reversed halo sign  

 Rib notching

 Ribbon ribs  

 Rice grain calcification  

 Rigler's sign  

 Ring around artery sign  

 Ring enhancing lesion

 Ring sign  

 Rod-like calcifications  

 Rolled edge sign 

 Romanus lesion

 Rugger jersey spine  

 Saber sheath trachea  

 Saber shin deformity  

 Sail sign

 Salt and pepper skull  

 Sandwich vertebra  

 Sausage digit  

 Scalloped vertebra  

 Scimitar sign  

 Scottie dog sign  

 Segond fracture  

 Sentinel loop  

 Shaggy oesophagus  

 Shenton's Line

 Shepherd's crook deformity  

 Shmoo sign  

 Signet ring sign  

 Silhouette sign  

 Silver fork deformity  

 Sister Mary Joseph sign  

 Small bowel faeces sign  

 Snowcapping appearance  

 Snowstorm appearance  

 Snowstorm appearance (lung)  

 Snowstorm pattern (breast)  

 Snowman sign  

 Soap bubbly appearance  

 Soft tissue rim sign  

 Sonographic Murphy sign

 Southwick angle

 Spaghetti sign  

 Spalding's sign

 Spilled teacup sign  

 Spine sign  

 Spinnaker sail sign  

 Split pleura sign  

 Spoke wheel appearance  

 Spotted nephrogram  

 Stack of coins appearance   

 Steeple sign  

 Stepladder appearance  

 Stepladder sign  

 Stocking glove sign  

 String of beads sign 

 String of beads sign (GI)  

 String of pearls sign  

 String sign  

 Stripe sign   

 Sunburst periosteal reaction  

 Swan neck deformity  

 Swiss cheese appearance (cardiac)  

 Talar beak  

 Target calcification  

 Target sign (Gastrointestinal system)  

 Target sign (Ultrasound)  

 Threads and streaks sign  

 Three sign (cardiac)  

 Thumb sign  

 Thumbprint sign

 Thurstan Holland sign

 Thymic sail sign  

 Teacup calcification (breast)  

 Teardrop sign  

 Terry Thomas Sign  

 Tram track sign

 Tree in bud sign  

 Tooth sign   

 Trethowan's sign

 Trolley track sign  

 Trough sign  

 Tubular artery sign  

 Tulip bulb aorta  

 Tumbling bullet sign  
	
 Upside down stomach sign  

 Vacuum disk sign  

 Vacuum joint  

 Vanishing tumor  

 Water bottle heart  

 Water lily sign  

 Westermark sign 

 White cerebellum sign

 Wilkinson's syndrome

 Whirlpool sign  

 Wimberger's ring sign  

 Wimberger's sign  
	
 Y Sign  

 Yinyang sign

Radiologic signs